Bijan Taheri (born 21 March 1961) is an Iranian football coach and retired player.

References

1961 births
Living people
Esteghlal F.C. players
Association football midfielders
Iranian expatriate footballers
Iranian footballers
Rah Ahan players
Mohammedan SC (Dhaka) players